The Men's 100m T11 had its first round held on September 8, beginning at 17:32. The Semifinals were held on September 9, at 12:38 and the A and B Finals were held on the same day at 17:30.

Medalists

Results

References
Round 1 - Heat 1
Round 1 - Heat 2
Round 1 - Heat 3
Round 1 - Heat 4
Round 1 - Heat 5
Round 1 - Heat 6
Round 1 - Heat 7
Semifinals - Heat 1
Semifinals - Heat 2
Final A
Final B

Athletics at the 2008 Summer Paralympics